Scarborough East was a provincial electoral riding in Ontario, Canada. It was created prior to the 1963 provincial election and eliminated in 1996, when most of its territory was incorporated into the riding of Pickering—Scarborough East. Scarborough East riding was created from part of the former riding of York—Scarborough. It was in the former borough of Scarborough.

Seven Members of Provincial Parliament represented the riding during its 
history. Liberals Ed Fulton and Mary Anne Chambers and Conservatives Margaret Birch and Steve Gilchrist were all members of cabinet in their respective times.

Boundaries
The riding was created in 1963 through an amendment to the Representation Act. It formed the eastern part of the former riding of York—Scarborough. The riding encompassed all of Scarborough to the east of Markham Road from Lake Ontario to the south and Steeles Avenue to the north.

In 1975 was reduced to about half its 1963 territory. With the southern edge as Lake Ontario, The boundaries were as follows: it went north on Markham Road to the CNR right-of-way. It followed the tracks east to Scarborough Golf Club Road, north along this road to Ellesmere Road, west along this road back to Markham Road. It continued north along Markham Road to Highway 401. It then turned east following the highway which constituted the northern boundary to the city limits and then south along the Rouge River back to the lake.

The boundaries were changed slightly in 1987. Highway 401, the Rouge River and Lake Ontario still served as the north, east and south borders respectively. The western border was changed as follows. Starting at the lake it headed north on Markham Road to Lawrence Avenue. It then followed Lawrence east until it met a tributary to Highland Creek. It followed the tributary northeast until it met another part of Highland Creek. It then followed this branch northwest until Highway 401. It then continued east on Highway 401 as per the 1975 boundary.

Members of Provincial Parliament

Electoral results

1963 boundaries

1975 boundaries

1987 boundaries

References

Notes

Citations

Former provincial electoral districts of Ontario
Provincial electoral districts of Toronto
Scarborough, Toronto